Villa Virginia is a historic country estate on Ice Glen Road in Stockbridge, Massachusetts.  Built in 1914–15, it is one of the last of the great Berkshire Cottages to be built in Stockbridge, and a significant example of Mediterranean Renaissance Revival architecture.  It was listed on the National Register of Historic Places in 1983.

History
Villa Virginia is located on the east side of Ice Glen Road between its northern end and the Ice Glen trailhead. In the late nineteenth century this was the site of an estate owned by John and Isabella Wyman Winthrop, who operated a gentleman's farm on the property. Under their ownership, Isadora Duncan danced on the property's lawn. The site was purchased by William H. Clarke who razed the earlier structures and commissioned architects Hiss and Weekes to build a new estate on it in 1914. It is constructed in the style of a Tuscan villa of the Renaissance. It was also a working farm and had substantial outbuildings devoted to animals and farm machinery. The landscape was designed by Ferruccio Vitale, its formal features including a lily pond, grotto, and walled garden.

During the 1970s, like many Berkshire cottages it was considered a "white elephant" and, as a consequence, wound up uninhabited and severely run down. From 1979 to 1998 it was a home and private gallery for artist Kazys Varnelis who extensively restored the structure and grounds.

References

External links
Luxury Villas

Houses completed in 1914
Stockbridge, Massachusetts
Villas in the United States
Italianate architecture in Massachusetts
Houses in Berkshire County, Massachusetts
Houses on the National Register of Historic Places in Berkshire County, Massachusetts
Gilded Age